Günselsdorf is a town in the district of Baden in Lower Austria in Austria.

Population

Economy
The global headquarters of Feller GmbH, a worldwide manufacturer of power cords, data cables and interconnection wiring, is situated here.

References

Cities and towns in Baden District, Austria